Edwardsville is an unincorporated community in Georgetown Township, Floyd County, Indiana. The Duncan Tunnel is located at Edwardsville.

History
Edwardsville was platted in 1853 by Henry H. Edwards, and named for him. A post office was established at Edwardsville in 1858, and remained in operation until it was discontinued in 1905.

Geography 

Geology 
The Edwardsville Formation is a geological structure in the Borden Group, of the Lower Mississippian sub system, (Osagean, late Tournaisian). Crinoids fossils can be found in the formation.

References 

Unincorporated communities in Floyd County, Indiana
Unincorporated communities in Indiana
Louisville metropolitan area
Populated places established in 1853
1853 establishments in Indiana